Antonio Marchesano (born 18 January 1991) is a Swiss professional footballer who plays as a midfielder for FC Zürich in the Swiss Super League.

Marchesano previously played for GC Biaschesi, Locarno, Bellinzona, FC Winterthur and Biel-Bienne.

Career
Marchesano signed a contract until June 2020 with FC Zürich in September 2015.

Personal life
Marchesano is of Italian descent.

References

External links
 
 FC Zurich Stats

1991 births
Living people
People from Bellinzona
Swiss people of Italian descent
Swiss men's footballers
Association football midfielders
Switzerland under-21 international footballers
Switzerland youth international footballers
Swiss Super League players
Swiss Challenge League players
FC Locarno players
AC Bellinzona players
FC Winterthur players
FC Biel-Bienne players
FC Zürich players
Sportspeople from Ticino